Dendrochilum glumaceum, the hay-scented orchid or husk-like dendrochilum, was described by John Lindley in 1841. It is an elegant looking epiphytic or lithophytic dendrochilum that occurs in the Philippines and Borneo at altitudes between 700 and 2,300 m.

This species possesses long feathery pendulous spikes containing two rows of pure white flowers, with yellow to orange lips, that emerge on each new growth.

From each conical to ovoid pseudobulb grows an erect,  single, long, oblanceolate leaf

Cultivation 
This species can be grown in pots and prefers intermediate temperatures and moderate to bright light.

There are several cultivars available :  'Broad Leaf', 'OHG', 'Orange and White Ring' and 'Orange Lip'. 'White Ring' and  'White with Orange Lip'.

References

External links 

glumaceum
Orchids of Borneo
Orchids of the Philippines
Epiphytic orchids